Keo is a town in southwest Lonoke County, Arkansas, United States. The population was 256 at the 2010 census. It is part of the Little Rock–North Little Rock–Conway Metropolitan Statistical Area.

History
Keo had its start as a shipping station when the railroad was extended to that point.

Geography
Keo is located in southwestern Lonoke County at  (34.605394, -92.010099). U.S. Route 165 passes through the town, leading northwest  to North Little Rock and southeast  to England. Arkansas Highway 15 leads north from Keo  to Furlow and southeast with US 165 to England. Arkansas Highway 232 leads west from the center of Keo.

Demographics

As of the census of 2000, there were 235 people, 96 households, and 69 families residing in the town. The population density was 123.9 inhabitants per square mile (47.8/km2). The racial makeup of the town was 19.87% White, 80.33% Black or African American, 0.43% from other races.  1.70% of the population were Hispanic or Latino of any race.

There were 96 households, out of which 28.1% had children under the age of 18 living with them, 59.4% were married couples living together, 7.3% had a female householder with no husband present, and 28.1% were non-families. 27.1% of all households were made up of individuals, and 10.4% had someone living alone who was 65 years of age or older.  The average household size was 2.45 and the average family size was 2.97.

In the town, the population was spread out, with 23.8% under the age of 18, 6.0% from 18 to 24, 26.8% from 25 to 44, 24.7% from 45 to 64, and 18.7% who were 65 years of age or older.  The median age was 40 years. For every 100 females, there were 102.6 males.  For every 100 females age 18 and over, there were 103.4 males.

The median income for a household in the town was $40,250, and the median income for a family was $43,333. Males had a median income of $24,028 versus $26,000 for females. The per capita income for the town was $21,159.  About 10.3% of families and 18.3% of the population were below the poverty line, including 38.3% of those under the age of eighteen and 7.0% of those 65 or over.

Commerce and industry 
Keo has become particularly notable in recent years for its marketing of antiques, with the largest dealer — Morris Antiques which is permanently closed — having once operated a 10-building complex including space for item sales and antique restoration. As in much of the surrounding region, agriculture is the other driving economic force in the area around Keo, primarily in the raising of catfish and cultivation of cotton and pecans.

Climate
The climate in this area is characterized by hot, humid summers and generally mild to cool winters.  According to the Köppen Climate Classification system, Keo has a humid subtropical climate, abbreviated "Cfa" on climate maps.

Education
Keo is in the England School District, which includes England High School.

References

External links
Official website

Towns in Lonoke County, Arkansas
Towns in Arkansas
Little Rock–North Little Rock–Conway metropolitan area